A peremptory norm (also called ) is a fundamental principle of international law that is accepted by the international community of states as a norm from which no derogation is permitted.

There is no universal agreement regarding precisely which norms are jus cogens nor how a norm reaches that status, but it is generally accepted that jus cogens bans genocide, maritime piracy, enslaving in general (i.e. slavery as well as slave trade), wars of aggression and territorial aggrandizement, torture, and refoulement.  The latter two are evolving and controversial as they rest mainly on the definition of torture in regards to criminal sentencing. If sentencing is not cruel, inhuman or degrading but arbitrary or disproportionate convictions are imposed then a state's refoulement – where limited to the returning of unsubstantiated asylum claimants – may still be lawfully conducted to many such countries which are juridically developing, such as those lacking a clear separation of powers, with a relatively heightened risk of political persecution and reports of unfair trials.

Status of peremptory norms under international law
Unlike ordinary customary law, which has traditionally required consent and allows the alteration of its obligations between states through treaties, peremptory norms may not be violated by any state "through international treaties or local or special customs or even general customary rules not endowed with the same normative force".

Discussions of the necessity of such norms could be traced back as far as 1758 (in Vattel's The Law of Nations) and 1764 (in Christian Wolff's Jus Gentium), clearly rooted in principles of natural law. But it was the judgments of the Permanent Court of International Justice that indicate the existence of such a peremptory norm, in the S.S. Wimbledon case in 1923, not mentioning peremptory norms explicitly but stating how state sovereignty is not inalienable.

Under Article 53 of the Vienna Convention on the Law of Treaties, any treaty that conflicts with a peremptory norm is void. The treaty allows for the emergence of new peremptory norms, but does not specify any peremptory norms. It does mention the prohibition on the threat of use of force and on the use of coercion to conclude an agreement:

A treaty is void if, at the time of its conclusion, it conflicts with a peremptory norm of general international law. For the purposes of the present Convention, a peremptory norm of general international law is a norm accepted and recognized by the international community of states as a whole as a norm from which no derogation is permitted and which can be modified only by a subsequent norm of general international law having the same character.

The number of peremptory norms is considered limited but not exclusively catalogued. They are not listed or defined by any authoritative body, but arise out of case law and changing social and political attitudes. Generally included are prohibitions on waging aggressive war, crimes against humanity, war crimes, maritime piracy, genocide, apartheid, slavery, and torture. As an example, international tribunals have held that it is impermissible for a state to acquire territory through war.

Despite the seemingly clear weight of condemnation of such practices, some critics disagree with the division of international legal norms into a hierarchy. There is also disagreement over how such norms are recognized or established. The relatively new concept of peremptory norms seems to be at odds with the traditionally consensual nature of international law considered necessary to state sovereignty.

Some peremptory norms define criminal offences considered to be enforceable against not only states but also individuals. That has been increasingly accepted since the Nuremberg Trials (the first enforcement in world history of international norms upon individuals) and now might be considered uncontroversial. However, the language of peremptory norms was not used in connection with these trials; rather, the basis of criminalisation and punishment of Nazi atrocities was that civilisation could not tolerate their being ignored because it could not survive their being repeated.

There are often disagreements over whether a particular case violates a peremptory norm. As in other areas of law, states generally reserve the right to interpret the concept for themselves.

Many large states have accepted this concept. Some of them have ratified the Vienna Convention, while others have stated in their official statements that they accept the Vienna Convention as "codificatory". Some have applied the concept in their dealings with international organizations and other states.

Examples

Execution of juvenile offenders
The case of Michael Domingues v. United States provides an example of an international body's opinion that a particular norm is of a jus cogens nature. Michael Domingues had been convicted and sentenced to death in Nevada, United States for two murders committed when he was 16 years old. Domingues brought the case in front of the Inter-American Commission of Human Rights which delivered a non-legally binding report. The United States argued that there was no jus cogens norm that "establishes eighteen years as the minimum age at which an offender can receive a sentence of death". The Commission concluded that there was a "jus cogens norm not to impose capital punishment on individuals who committed their crimes when they had not yet reached 18 years of age".

The United States has subsequently banned the execution of juvenile offenders. Although not necessarily in response to the above non-binding report, the Supreme Court cited evolving international norms as one of the reasons for the ban (Roper v. Simmons).

Torture
The prohibition of torture is a rule of customary international law regarded as ius cogens.
The International Criminal Tribunal for the Former Yugoslavia stated in Prosecutor v. Furundžija that there is a jus cogens for the prohibition against torture. It also stated that every state is entitled "to investigate, prosecute and punish or extradite individuals accused of torture, who are present in a territory under its jurisdiction". The United States Court of Appeals for the Second Circuit stated in Filártiga v. Peña-Irala that "the torturer has become, like the pirate and the slave trader before him, hostis humani generis, an enemy of all mankind".

See also
Actio popularis
Entrenched clause
Erga omnes
List of treaties by number of parties
Universal jurisdiction

References

External links
Jus cogens (bibliography)

International law
International criminal law
Legal doctrines and principles
International law legal terminology